Phil Adrian (born c. 1933) is a former Canadian football player who played for the Montreal Alouettes. He played in 39 games for the Alouettes over four seasons from 1951–54.

References

1930s births
Living people
Canadian football running backs
Montreal Alouettes players
Players of Canadian football from Ontario
Sportspeople from Hamilton, Ontario